Pattina Pravesam is a 1977 Indian Tamil-language drama film written and directed by K. Balachander. It is based on the play of the same name, written by Visu and staged the same year. The film stars Delhi Ganesh, Sivachandran and Sarath Babu, all making their cinematic acting debuts. It was released on 9 September 1977.

Plot 

A village family consisting of a widow, her four sons and daughter, are lured into living in a city. Each member goes through their own troubles in the city and on being completely disillusioned with city life, the family returns to their village.

Cast 
 Delhi Ganesh as Murugan
 Jai Ganesh as Saravanan
 Sivachandran as Kumaran
 Kathadi Ramamurthy as Innocent Dhandapani
 Sarath Babu
 Meera
 Swarna

Production 
Pattina Pravesam was written and directed by K. Balachander, and based on the play of the same name which was written by Visu and staged in 1977, by Stage Creations. The film adaptation was produced by R. Venkataraman under Premalaya Films, and marked the cinematic acting debuts of Delhi Ganesh, Sivachandran and Sarath Babu. S. V. Subbaiah was originally cast in the role Ganesh portrayed in the play, but died before production could begin, so Ganesh reprised his role. Kathadi Ramamurthy, who played a character named "Innocent Dhandapani" in the play, also reprised his role in the film.

Soundtrack 
The soundtrack was composed by M. S. Viswanathan and the lyrics were written by Kannadasan. The song "Vaan Nila" was well received and attained cult status.

Release and reception 
Pattina Pravesam was released on 9 September 1977. The magazine Ananda Vikatan gave the film a rating of 52 out of 100.

Notes

References

External links 
 

1970s Tamil-language films
1977 drama films
Films directed by K. Balachander
Films scored by M. S. Viswanathan
Indian drama films
Indian films based on plays